Grant's rock mouse or Grant's rock rat (Aethomys granti) is a species of rodent in the family Muridae
found only in South Africa.  It is sometimes included in the genus Micaelamys.
Its natural habitats are subtropical or tropical dry shrubland and rocky areas.

References

Endemic fauna of South Africa
Aethomys
Mammals of South Africa
Mammals described in 1908
Taxonomy articles created by Polbot
Taxobox binomials not recognized by IUCN